The 2007–08 Idaho Vandals men's basketball team represented the University of Idaho during the 2007–08 NCAA Division I men's basketball season. Members of the Western Athletic Conference (WAC), the Vandals were led by second-year head coach George Pfeifer and played their home games on campus at Cowan Spectrum in Moscow, Idaho.

They met host New Mexico State in the quarterfinals of the conference tournament and lost by twenty points.

Pfeiefer was fired days later, succeeded by Don Verlin, an assistant at Utah State under Stew Morrill.

Postseason result

|-
!colspan=5 style=| WAC Tournament

References

External links
Sports Reference – Idaho Vandals: 2007–08 basketball season
Idaho Argonaut – student newspaper – 2008 editions

Idaho Vandals men's basketball seasons
Idaho
Idaho Vandals men's basketball team
Idaho Vandals men's basketball team